Nagybudmér is a village and municipality in Baranya County, Hungary. Residents are Magyars, with minority of Germans.

Geography 
Nagybudmér is located in east central Baranya County, about halfway between the towns of Bóly and Villány. It is about 15 kilometers west of the Danube, 15 kilometers from Croatia and 50 kilometers from Serbia. The municipality lies within the Southern Transdanubia Region of Hungary. It previously was part of the Mohács Subregion but during the creation of districts in 2013, it became part of Bóly District.

Demographics 
During the census of 2011, the population was 188. The vast majority of the population claimed Hungarian ethnicity (91.2%), though 19.7% also claimed German ethnicity and the municipality has a German local minority self-government. Other ethnicities included Roma (4.1%). 7.8% did not wish to answer. In terms of religious practice, 64.8% reported to be Roman Catholic, 4.1% Calvinist, 1% Other, 4.7% of no religious affiliation and 24.9% did not wish to answer.

Transport 
The closest railway station is in Villány, 13 kilometers to the south.

Points of Interest 
 St. Martin's Church, built in 1908.

References 

Populated places in Baranya County
Serb communities in Hungary